Bishop Wiesław Śpiewak, C.R. (born 19 October 1963) is a Polish-born Bermudian Roman Catholic prelate who serves as the first Diocesan Bishop of Roman Catholic Diocese of Hamilton in Bermuda since 13 June 2015.

Education
Bishop Śpiewak was born into a Polish Roman Catholic family in Kraków and was parishioner of the Resurrection parish in Wola Duchacka district.

After graduated his school education, he joined a religious congregation of the Resurrectionists and after the novitiate made a profession on 15 September 1984. He consequently studied philosophy at the Vincentian Institute in Kraków and continued his studies of theology at the Pontifical Gregorian University in Rome, Italy, the master's degree at the Academy of Theology in Kraków and the licentiate of the Spirituality degree at the Salesian Pontifical University in Rome  and was ordained a priest on 19 May 1990 by Bishop Stanisław Smoleński in Kraków, after completed his philosophical and theological studies.

Pastoral, administrative and educational work
After his ordination Fr. Śpiewak was engaged in the different services and from 1990 until 1992 was a Vice-Rector of the Minor Seminary of the Resurrectionists in Poznań, Poland; during 1992–1995 was a Vocational Pastoral Director and Secretary of the Provincial Superior in Warsaw and Kraków and during 1996–1997 was a Vocational Pastoral Director and Head of the Emmaus Vocation Center in Mszana Górna.

In 1997 he was transferred to Rome and here held a various positions at the Generalate. During 1998–2014 was a Postulator General of the Resurrections, while served a parish priest of Santa Maria Maddalena in Capranica Prenestina in the Roman Catholic Suburbicarian Diocese of Palestrina from 1998 until 2003, when he returned to Rome to serve at the Generalate. Later he returned to Poland and was elected a Provincial Superior of the Resurrectionists in Poland (2010–2015).

Prelate
On 13 June 2015, Fr. Śpiewak was appointed by Pope Francis as a Diocesan Bishop of Roman Catholic Diocese of Hamilton in Bermuda. On 1 October 2015, he was consecrated as bishop by his predecessor, Bishop Emeritus Robert Kurtz and other prelates of the Roman Catholic Church in the Cathedral of Saint Theresa of Lisieux in Hamilton, Bermuda is the feast of St. Thérèse of Lisieux.

References

1963 births
Living people
Clergy from Kraków
Bermudian Roman Catholic bishops
Resurrectionist Congregation
Pontifical Gregorian University alumni
Pontifical University of John Paul II alumni
Salesian Pontifical University alumni
21st-century Roman Catholic bishops in British Overseas Territories
Roman Catholic bishops of Hamilton in Bermuda
21st-century Roman Catholic bishops
Bishops appointed by Pope Francis